Anzor Zaurovich Koblev (born 2 August 1966) is a Russian professional football coach and a former player.

Club career
He made his Russian Football National League debut for FC Druzhba Maykop on 25 April 1992 in a game against FC Uralan Elista. He played 5 seasons in the FNL for Druzhba, FC Chernomorets Novorossiysk and FC Gazovik-Gazprom Izhevsk.

External links 
 

1966 births
Living people
Soviet footballers
Russian footballers
Association football defenders
FC Chernomorets Novorossiysk players
Russian football managers